Nothobranchius sp. nov. 'Lake Victoria' is a scientifically undescribed species of freshwater fish in the family Nothobranchiidae. It is endemic to Kenya, and inhabits intermittent freshwater marshes. It was listed as vulnerable in the IUCN Red List of Threatened Species in 2004, but is not included in recent versions of the list.

Sources 
 Hanssens, M. 2004.  Nothobranchius sp. nov. 'Lake Victoria'.   IUCN Red List of Threatened Species 2008.  Downloaded on 4 August 2016.
 Stefano Valdesalici (2012) Nothobranchius kardashevi and Nothobranchius ivanovae (Cyprinodontiformes: Nothobranchiidae): two new annual killifishes from the Katuma River drainage, western Tanzania  aqua, International Journal of Ichthyology

Nothobranchius
Undescribed vertebrate species
Endemic freshwater fish of Kenya
Taxonomy articles created by Polbot